Amanda Anne Crawford (born 16 February 1971) is a former association football player who represented New Zealand at international level.

Crawford scored the only goal on her full Football Ferns debut in a 1–0 win over Chinese Taipei on 28 March 1989 and ended her international career with 41 caps and 11 goals to her credit.

Crawford represented New Zealand at the Women's World Cup finals in China in 1991.

References

External links

1971 births
Living people
New Zealand women's international footballers
New Zealand women's association footballers
1991 FIFA Women's World Cup players
Women's association football forwards